Carex umbrosa is a species of sedge native to Europe and Asia as far east as Japan.

References

External links

umbrosa
Plants described in 1801
Flora of Asia